Electric Park was a name shared by dozens of amusement parks in the United States that were constructed as trolley parks and owned by electric companies and streetcar companies. After 1903, the success of Coney Island inspired a proliferation of parks named Luna Park and Electric Park, while the World's Columbian Exposition of 1893 inspired the formation of White City amusement parks at roughly the same time. The existence of most of these parks was generally brief: the bulk of them closed by 1917, the year of the United States' entry into World War I. Many pavilions have outlasted the parks themselves, with a few of them still standing today.

Electric Parks

The emergence of trolley parks in the last dozen years of the 19th century coincided with the rise to prominence of three entities: the electric companies (which grew rapidly as much of the United States was undergoing electrification since the 1880s), the railway companies (which constructed new interurban rail lines mainly in the eastern half of the U. S.), and – starting about 1890 – the replacement of horse-drawn cars by electric trolley companies. A fourth contributor to the rise in amusement parks in the first decade of the 20th century was the success of Coney Island, which spurred the establishment of dozens of Electric Parks, Luna Parks, and White City amusement parks (the latter actually inspired by White City in the 1893 World's Columbian Exhibition in Chicago), with many metropolitan areas having two (or more) parks with these names.

Most Electric Parks were owned by electric companies and trolley companies, which often had one or more lines that transported workers and shoppers between the downtown areas of the various cities and residential and industrial areas. (After 1900, interurban electric rail lines began carrying commuters from one city to another). Originally, the trolleys and interurban lines would either operate at a reduced level on weekends or be completely idle. To generate weekend traffic, the companies eventually created new destinations, generally at the end of their lines, for the public to attend on the weekends, whether it be a picnic park or (later) an amusement park. Regardless of the type of park, the destinations owned by the local electric company or accessed by the electric trolley were commonly called electric parks. After 1903, Luna Park in Coney Island's success (with the park's entrance decked with electric lights) inspired the creation of Electric Parks, which spread throughout North America (at the same time, the similarly-inspired Frederick Ingersoll started to construct his Luna Park empire).

Like their Luna Park and White City cousins, a typical Electric Park featured a shoot-the-chutes and lagoon, a roller coaster (usually a figure eight or a mountain railway), a midway, a Ferris wheel, games, and a pavilion. Most also had miniature railroads. Many cities had two (or all three) of the Electric Park/Luna Park/White City triumvirate in their vicinity... with each trying to outdo the others with new attractions, with many incorporating an exhibit simulating the Johnstown Flood of 1889. The competition was fierce, often driving the electric parks out of business with increasing costs of equipment upgrades, upkeep, and insurance. More than a few succumbed to fire. As a result, most were out of business by 1917, the year the United States entered World War I. By the time troops returned to the U.S. (in 1919), almost all the Electric Parks were gone.

List of Electric Parks  

While the date and location of the first Electric Park is currently unknown, several existed before 1900. Since then, dozens of amusement parks had acquired the name:

 Electric Park, Aberdeen, Washington
 Electric Park, Atlanta, Georgia
 Electric Park, Baltimore, Maryland (June 1896 – 1916)
 Electric Park, Bellingham, Washington

 Electric Park, Binghamton, New York
 Electric Park, Blackwell, Oklahoma – pavilion still stands, listed on the National Register of Historic Places
 Electric Park, Cleveland, Ohio
 Electric Park, Dayton, Ohio
 Electric Park, Detroit, Michigan (26 May 1906 – 1928), went through several names in its existence, including Luna Park
 Electric Park, Eau Claire, Wisconsin (1895 – c. 1926) – park adjacent to nearby Lake Hallie; closed after Chippewa Valley Electric Railway ceased operations on September 1, 1926
 Electric Park, Fort Smith, Arkansas (1905–1920)
 Electric Park, Galveston, Texas (1905–?)
 Electric Park, Hancock, Michigan (7 June 1906 – c. 1933) – originally Anwebida ("Let us rest here" in Chippewa)
 Electric Park, Holland, Michigan, also known as Jenison Electric Park
 Electric Park, Houston, Texas
 Electric Park, Iola, Kansas (ca. 1901–1918), also known as "Iola Electric Park"
 Electric Park, Joplin, Missouri (10 June 1909 – 1912) – now part of Schifferdecker Park
 Electric Park, Kansas City, Missouri (1907–1925) - second Electric Park by the Heim Brothers, who opened their first Electric Park in 1899, adjacent to their Kansas City brewery
 Electric Park, Louisville, Kentucky
 Electric Park, Montgomery, Alabama
 Electric Park, New Haven, Connecticut
 Electric Park, Newark, New Jersey (1903–1912) park that is now the site of Vailsburg Park
 Electric Park, Niagara Falls, New York
 Electric Park, Niverville, New York, New York(1901–1917), also known as White City
 Electric Park, Oshkosh, Wisconsin (1898 – c. 1950), also called White City and EWECO Park
 Electric Park, Pensacola, Florida (1905–?)
 Electric Park, Pittsburgh, Pennsylvania
 Electric Park, Plainfield, Illinois (1904–1932); auditorium became a dance hall and then a skating rink (both roller and ice) until destroyed by tornado in 1990    
 Electric Park, Pottsville, Pennsylvania – also called Electric Park Philadelphia
 Electric Park, St. Louis, Missouri in Creve Coeur Park
 Electric Park, San Antonio, Texas - currently the site of minor league baseball park of same name
 Electric Park, Sheboygan, Wisconsin
 Electric Park, Springfield, Missouri – may be same as Joplin Electric Park
 Electric Park, Syracuse, New York
 Electric Park, Tulsa, Oklahoma (1921 – c. 1926)- merged into Crystal City Amusement Park in mid 1920s
 Electric Park, Waterloo, Iowa – had unique water-turned ferris wheel; pavilion still standing
 Electric Park, Worcester, Massachusetts

See also
Tucson Electric Park, baseball stadium in Tucson, Arizona

References

Defunct amusement parks in the United States